A meniskos (plural Meniskoi: "crescent moon") is a bronze disk mounted above some Greek statues on an iron nail drilled through the statue's head.

Purpose
Since many Greek statues were displayed outside, the meniskos served the simple purpose of preventing bird feces from accumulating on the statue.

Meniskoi are mentioned in Aristophanes' The Birds, when the birds threaten the judges saying:

See also
Bird control spike

References 

Ancient Greek sculpture